Spilarctia procedra is a moth in the family Erebidae. It was described by Charles Swinhoe in 1907. It is found on Sumatra in Indonesia.

References

Moths described in 1907
procedra